Pete Adrian (born August 11, 1948) is a former American football coach.  He served as the head football coach at Bloomsburg University from 1986 to 1992 and at Norfolk State University (NSU) from 2005 to 2014. Adrian was an assistant coach at Bethune–Cookman University, the University of West Virginia, Idaho State University, and the University of Rhode Island.

Head coaching record

College

References

External links
 Norfolk State profile

Living people
1948 births
Bethune–Cookman Wildcats football coaches
Bloomsburg Huskies football coaches
Chicago Enforcers coaches
Idaho State Bengals football coaches
Norfolk State Spartans football coaches
Rhode Island Rams football coaches
West Virginia Mountaineers football players
High school football coaches in Florida
People from Jefferson County, Ohio